Christopher Weguelin (1838 – 6 September 1881) was an Irish Liberal politician.

Weguelin was educated at Harrow School and then Trinity College, Cambridge. Between 1867 and 1881, he was a director of the Bank of England.

Weguelin was elected MP as a Liberal candidate for Youghal in the 1868 general election, but his election was declared void the next year, due to treating. He was unseated, causing a by-election.

References

External links
 

1838 births
1881 deaths
Irish Liberal Party MPs
UK MPs 1868–1874
Members of the Parliament of the United Kingdom for County Waterford constituencies (1801–1922)